Helene Elisabeth Jonsson (born March 11, 1971) is a Swedish female curler.

Teams

References

External links

Living people
1971 births
Swedish female curlers